A climbing gym is a gym dedicated to indoor climbing. Climbing gyms have climbing walls that can be used for leading, top roping, and bouldering. They sometimes offer training equipment to improve technique, strength, and endurance.

Contents of a climbing gym 
Different kinds of climbing gyms focus on various types of climbing, and their layout and equipment vary accordingly.

Climbing walls 

A climbing wall is an artificial wall designed for climbing. Gyms dedicated to bouldering tend to have short routes without bolts, usually no more than 6 metres tall. Other gyms including or focused on sport climbing will include taller walls with bolts and quickdraws. Some climbing gyms may also include auto belays, which are motors designed to allow someone to climb without the assistance of a belayer. Some gyms may have a wall dedicated to speed climbing, in which case an auto belay will be used. A climbing gym will often have walls of several different styles, including slab walls, overhangs, and vertical walls. Some climbing gyms include programmable climbing walls such as a moon board which allow users to set climbs using a fixed set of holds and upload them for other users to try. When a climber selects a climb to try, the relevant holds are lit up by LEDs.

Problems and climbs 
Most climbs in a climbing gym (known as "problems" in bouldering) will have an approximate climbing grade and a way of identifying the holds to be used. In some gyms, holds are identified by coloured tape placed next to each hold, but it is becoming more common for the holds of a given climb to all be the same or similar colour for easy identification. Climbs will usually have some method of identifying the "starting holds" (the holds you use to start the climb) such as tags or tape next to each starting hold. Although the practice is not universal, many gyms use a circuit system wherein climbs of a similar grade in a gym will be the same colour, will be reset at the same time, and sometimes will be set in a particular style.

Training section 

Many climbing gyms will contain an area dedicated to training. This can include general physical fitness equipment, such as a bench, weights, or a Pullup bar, but can often include climbing-specific training equipment such as a campus board or hangboards. Climbing gyms often have equipment related to calisthenics and bodyweight training, including Resistance bands, dip belts, and rings.

Climbing equipment 

Climbing gyms have a lot of equipment dedicated to climbing. Most gyms, regardless of the type of climbing they are designed for, will offer climbing shoes for rent. Climbing gyms that offer sport climbing will also offer harnesses, ropes, and belay devices. Some climbers may bring other equipment, such as chalk bags or liquid chalk. Most climbing gyms offer rent of necessary equipment, and some have shops which allow the purchase of equipment. Other equipment which may be on offer includes finger tape or helmets.

Specialist variations 

 In Germany, a "Klettergarten" (translated as a climbing garden), is a type of climbing centre that focuses on short introductory routes for novice climbers.

Safety 
Climbing is a dangerous sport which can cause many injuries. To mitigate this, climbing gyms have equipment and precautions in place to ensure safety.

Policies 
Safety policies are the practices and rules enforced by a climbing gym to ensure the safety of its climbers. This may include supervision, ensuring that unsupervised climbers have enough experience to keep themselves safe, or rules to dissuade dangerous behavior, such as walking under climbers or jumping from high bouldering walls. Climbing gyms often have lessons for people to learn climbing safety and technique.

Equipment 
Climbing gyms have equipment designed to keep people safe. This includes harnesses to avoid dangerous falls, padded floors around bouldering walls to soften landings, and extra holds designed to help people to climb down from the top of difficult climbs.

History 
The first climbing holds and walls were designed for climbers to keep training during the winter. Early walls and holds evolved in the late 1970s and early 1980s from wood strips screwed to garage walls, glued rocks, and other improvisations.  The first 'modern' molded plastic holds with a bolt in the middle were created by French climber François Savigny in 1983, sparking a nascent industry.
The first facility that would be recognized as a climbing gym today was established in Seattle, Washington by climbers Rich Johnston and Dan Cauthorn in January 1987.  The gym, called Vertical Club, was created with a $14,000 budget with the aid of the local community, by gluing rocks onto the walls.

Climbing with a Disability

Paraclimbing 
Paraclimbing is a type of rock climbing specifically tailored for individuals with cognitive, sensory, or physical disabilities. Paraclimbing competitions offer a range of climbing disciplines, including bouldering, lead climbing, and speed climbing, and are categorized based on the nature and severity of the disability. To ensure fairness, paraclimbing competitions have unique rules and equipment adaptations, such as prostheses or adapted climbing equipment, and may also permit sighted guides or verbal signals for visually impaired climbers.

Notes

References

Indoor climbing
Climbing equipment
Climbing and health
Exercise equipment
Strength training